Chupa Chups is a Spanish brand of lollipop and other confectionery sold in over 150 countries around the world. The brand was founded in 1958 by Enric Bernat, and is currently owned by the Italian-Dutch company Perfetti Van Melle. The name of the brand comes from the Spanish verb chupar, meaning "to suck".

History 

In the early 1950s, Enric Bernat worked for an apple jam factory called "Granja Asturias". After he broached the idea of making lollipops, the investors left. Bernat took over the company in 1958 and renamed it Chupa Chups. He built the production machines and sold a striped bonbon on a wooden stick for one peseta each.

Bernat got the idea of his lollipops from him getting sticky hands from melting sweets. Bernat felt that at that time, sweets were not designed for children. Shopkeepers were instructed to place Chupa Chups near the cash register within reach of children's hands, instead of the usual placement behind the counter.

The Chupa Chups company was a success. Within five years, Bernat's sweets were being sold at 300,000 outlets. When the candy was first created, the lolly sticks were made of wood but they switched to plastic sticks. After the end of Francoist Spain (1939–75), the self-funded private company went international. In the 1970s the lollipops appeared in Japan and Southeast Asian countries such as Indonesia, Singapore, the Philippines and Malaysia, as well as India and Australia. In the 1980s, it expanded to the European and North American markets, and in the 1990s to most Asian countries, including South Korea. In China, they were manufactured by Tatagum in Panyu, near Guangzhou. , 4 billion lollipops a year are sold to 150 countries. , the company has 2,000 employees, makes 90 percent of its sales abroad, and has a turnover of €500,000,000.

In 1991, Bernat passed formal control of the company to his son Xavier. The Smint subsidiary brand/company was founded in 1994.

In July 2006, the company as a whole was acquired by the Italian-Dutch group Perfetti Van Melle.

Marketing 

The Chupa Chups logo was designed in 1969 by the surrealist artist Salvador Dalí. Its first marketing campaign was the logo with the slogan "Es redondo y dura mucho, Chupa Chups", which translates from Spanish as "It's round and long-lasting". Later, celebrities like Madonna were hired to advertise the product.

In the 1980s, as falling birth rates reduced the number of juvenile consumers, an anti-smoking slogan "Smoke Chupa Chups" was tried to attract adult consumers. The company's current anti-smoking slogan is "Stop smoking, start sucking", with their packages parodying cigarette pack designs. Some packages parody the mandatory black and white warning labels of the European Union with the notice "Sucking does not kill."

Chupa Chups sponsored the 1992 video game Zool. Their logo was featured prominently in the first level, "Sweet World".

In 1995, Chupa Chups became the first candy sent to the Mir space station.

In 1997, Chupa Chups launched a Spice Girls lollipop range with different packages each featuring a collectible Spice Girl sticker, toy microphones, and bubblegum packets that came with collectible Spice Girls temporary tattoos, as well as "Push Pops" and "Crazy Dips".

Between 2000 and 2003, Chupa Chups was the main shirt sponsor of English football team Sheffield Wednesday.

Since 2010, Chupa Chups was the signature of the Marriott brand hotel Springhill Suites. Chupa Chups were available at the front desk of any Springhill Suites property for free to any guest, child or adult. As of August 2021, Marriott has begun stepping away from Chupa Chups as a signature item for Springhill Suites.

Products 
Chupa Chups has a large product range, with their standard lollipop being the most popular.

 Lollipops
 Classic, 12 gram
 Cremosa (ice cream and yogurt flavors)
 Mini, 6 gram
 Filled Lollipops
 Magics (powder filled)
 Bubble Gum (with bubble gum center)
 Fruit-tella (flavors from nature)
 Chocolate (filled with chocolate)
 Cuore di Frutta
 2Pop
 Sugar Free
 XXL
 Crazy Dips (explosion)
 Melody Whistle Pops
 Bubble Gums
 Big Babol
 Cotton Bubblegum
 Toys
 Spinning Faces
 Totem Markers
 Funky Labyrinths
 Balloon Cars
 Gifts and Seasonal Gifts
 Mega Chups 750 gr
 Back Packs
 Chupa + Surprise
 License Products
 Sparkling Drinks 

Chupa Chups has more than 100 flavours available worldwide, including sugar-free varieties. They are individually heat-sealed in the factory, and are best opened by twisting the base of the wrapper.

References

External links 
 Chupa Chups World (official site) (Flash)
 Company History

1958 establishments in Spain
Salvador Dalí
Food and drink companies established in 1958
Lollipops
Food and drink companies based in Barcelona
Manufacturing companies based in Barcelona
Perfetti Van Melle brands
Spanish brands
Spanish subsidiaries of foreign companies